The Bombaso Formation, also known as Waidegger Conglomerate, Waidegger Group, Waidegg Formation or Collendiaul Formation, is a geologic formation in the Carnic Alps in southern Austria. It preserves fossils dated to the Moscovian age of the Carboniferous period.

Fossil content 
The following fossils have been reported from the formation:

Fusulinidae

 Protriticites ovatus
 Protriticites cf. ovoides
 Quasifusulinoides fallax
 Q. intermedius
 Q. quasifusulinoides
 Protriticites sp.

See also 
 List of fossiliferous stratigraphic units in Austria

References

Bibliography 
 

Geologic formations of Austria
Carboniferous System of Europe
Carboniferous Austria
Moscovian (Carboniferous)
Limestone formations
Carboniferous southern paleotropical deposits
Paleontology in Austria
Formations